Pepper steak is a stir-fried Chinese dish consisting of sliced beef steak (often flank, sirloin, or round) cooked with sliced bell peppers, bamboo shoots and other seasonings such as soy sauce and ginger, and usually thickened with cornstarch. Sliced onions and bean sprouts are also frequent additions to the recipe.

Evidence for the dish's existence in the United States dates from at least 1948. The dish originated from Fujian cuisine, where it was known as qīngjiāo ròusī (青椒炒肉絲). In the original dish the meat used was pork and the seasonings were relatively light compared to pepper steak.

Similar adaptations of the Chinese qīngjiāoròusī include gochu-japchae ("pepper japchae") found in Korean Chinese cuisine and chinjao-rōsu (青椒肉絲) found in Japanese Chinese cuisine.

References

External links
Pepper steak photo
Betty Ford's pepper steak recipe

American Chinese cuisine
Beef dishes